= Aldi Adilang =

Indonesian fisherman who was lost at sea for 49 days

Aldi Novel Adilang is an Indonesian fisherman who was stranded alone in the Pacific Ocean for 49 days in 2018.

Adilang survived by crafting his own spear and fishing pole to catch and cook fish. He was rescued by a commercial tanker from Panama.

== Biography ==
Aldi Adilang was born in Indonesia. and lived on Sulawesi. At age 16, he started working as a lamp keeper on a floating fish trap moored to the seabed 125 km out from the coast of North Sulawesi. During this time, he was stranded at sea for two short periods, "The first [time], I was afloat for a week and helped by the owner of the raft. The second time, I was afloat for two days and also received help from the owner of the raft."

On July 14, 2018, the rope securing the fish trap snapped, sending Adilang drifting into the Pacific Ocean. At the beginning, he had a month's worth of food and supplies. Once Adiliang's supplies ran out, he caught fish and cooked them, making a fire out of wood from his fish trap. He collected rainwater and also claimed to have filtered salt water through his shirt to make it drinkable; however, salt cannot be removed through filtering.

Adilang said that he occupied himself by singing Christian songs and reading the Bible, and prayed to see his parents again.

Some ships passed Adilang but none stopped for him. On August 31, 2018, he was picked up near Guam by the Arpeggio, a Panamanian tanker bound for Japan. Once in Japan, Adilang was flown back to Indonesia.
